Christy Curtis Buss (born December 28, 1958) is an American dancer, choreographer, and actress. She started her career as an actress and dancer before she became a Cheerleader and choreographer for the Los Angeles Rams and Los Angeles Clippers and the director or the Los Angeles Sparks Kids   Buss is the former daughter-in-law of Jerry Buss, who owned the Los Angeles Lakers and other sports businesses.

Early life 
Christy Curtis Buss was born on December 28, 1959, in St. Louis, Missouri. She grew up dancing at her mother's dance studio  and continued to hone her skills as a dancer and choreographer throughout her life.

Professional career 
After winning The ABC TV Special "All American Women" in 1979, Christy moved to Los Angeles, California. She became the captain of the Los Angeles Rams cheerleaders and traveled the world. Christy acted in commercials, film and soap operas which led her to choreographing shows such as NBC's "Passions" and "Days of Our Lives.” in 1999 or the movie “Private School”  in 1983. She also worked on choreography for "Sunset Beach," The LeAnn Rimes Tour, Paul Rodriquez and Dian Diaz in Las Vegas, MTV, Los Angeles Clippers, Los Angeles Sparks, and Bob Hope Super Bowl Special USO Tours  She also appeared as celebrity host on TV shows “Showbiz Tonight”  and Celebrity Host on "Showbiz Today”.
 
In 1993, Christy opened dance studio while also choreographing with partners and groups for special occasions. In 2016 Christy launched her online show "All About Christy". Buss sold her dance studio in 2021. She is now the founder and CEO of a skincare company.

Personal life 
Christy Curtis Buss was previously married to Johnny Buss, the former Executive Vice President of the Los Angeles Lakers and son of Jerry Buss. They were married in 1990 and divorced in 2015.

Awards and achievements 

Christy Curtis Buss received the 2002 Adjudicators Award at the Tremaine Dance Convention and the 2016 Artistic Director's Award at the LA Dance Magic Convention.

She was a six-time NBA champion for the Los Angeles Sparks and Los Angeles Lakers (as family and cheerleader team member).

External links 

 Christy Buss at IMDb
 Christy Buss
 Hedo

References 

1959 births
Living people
People from St. Louis County, Missouri
Los Angeles Lakers
Dancers
Choreographers
American actresses